The 2013–14 season was Athletic Bilbao's 115th in existence and the club's 83rd consecutive season in the top flight of Spanish football.

In addition to La Liga, Athletic Bilbao also competed in the Copa del Rey, being eliminated in the quarter-finals.

Players

Squad information

From the youth system

Transfers in

Total spending:  €15,100,000

Transfers out

Total income:  €0

Expenditure:   €15,100,000

Club

Current technical staff

Statistics

Squad statistics

The numbers and stats are established according to the official website: www.athletic-club.net''

Competitions

Pre-season

La Liga

League table

Results by round

Matches
Kickoff times are in CET.

Copa del Rey

Round of 32

Round of 16

Quarter-finals

References

Athletic Bilbao seasons
Athletic Bilbao